A by-election was held for the New South Wales Legislative Assembly electorate of Newtown on 12 July 1861 because of the resignation of Alexander McArthur who had been appointed to the Legislative Council.

Candidates
Two candidates were nominated:
Thomas Holt, a pastoralist, had represented Stanley Boroughs in 1856–1857, however he had been defeated at the elections for Cumberland (South Riding) in 1858 and Newtown in 1859.

Stephen Brown, a solicitor, had also been defeated at the election Newtown in 1859 and again in 1860.

Dates

Results

Alexander McArthur was appointed to the Legislative Council.

See also
Electoral results for the district of Newtown
List of New South Wales state by-elections

References

1861 elections in Australia
New South Wales state by-elections
1860s in New South Wales